The Convention on Consent to Marriage, Minimum Age for Marriage, and Registration of Marriages is a treaty agreed upon in the United Nations on the standards of marriage. The treaty was drafted by the Commission on the Status of Women and opened for signature and ratification by General Assembly resolution 1763 A (XVII) on 7 November 1962. It was entered into force 9 December 1964 by exchange of letters, in accordance with article 6. The Convention has been signed by 16 countries and there are 55 parties to the Convention. The Convention is based on article 16 of the Universal Declaration of Human Rights. The Convention reaffirms the consensual nature of marriages and requires the parties to establish a minimum marriage age by law and to ensure the registration of marriages.

History 
The idea for the convention first developed during the Supplementary Convention on the Abolition of Slavery, the Slave Trade, and Institutions and Practices Similar to Slavery adopted by a Conference of Plenipotentiaries in 1956. This 1956 convention included articles which asserted that underage and forced marriage was a form of slavery. Within article 1 of the convention, certain types of marriage were classified as slavery. The convention stated that institutions or practices that included forced marriage for payment, the transfer of a woman from her marriage/marriage family to transfer her for value, the transfer of a woman upon the death of the husband.

In 1957, the Commission on the Status of Women requested the Economic and Social Council to work on the convention. The draft articles, comments, and revised text were requested by the Commission in its twelfth session in 1958. The Commission on the Status of Women requested the Secretary-General to draft a convention and a recommendation on this issues.

Summary of Articles 
Article 1: Marriages should be entered into with the "full and free consent" of both parties. 

Article 2:  States participating in the convention shall set laws for the minimum age of marriage.  

Article 3: Marriages should be registered by the relevant authority.   

Article 4: The Convention was open for signature until 31 December 1963 and is subject to ratification.   

Article 5: The Convention is open for accession for all states referred to in Article 4.   

Article 6: This article details the date of accession for all states that are part of the Convention   

Article 7: This articles outlines the process of denunciation of the Convention   

Article 8: Disputes regarding interpretation or application should be referred to the International Court of Justice.   

Article 9: The Secretary-General shall notify relevant parties of signatures, instruments, date that the Convention enters into force, notifications of denunciation, and abrogation.   

Article 10: The Convention is published in several languages and is deposited in the archives of the United Nations. The Secretary-General shall transmit a copy to relevant parties.

List of signatories and parties

Status of child marriage 
Despite the development of this convention, child marriage and forced marriage are still an issue worldwide. More than 12 million girls were forced into marriage in 2020.

See also
Universal Declaration of Human Rights
Human trafficking
United Nations Commission on the Status of Women
Age of Marriage Act 1929

References

United Nations treaties
Treaties concluded in 1962
Treaties entered into force in 1964
Women's rights instruments
Marriage age
Minimum ages
Treaties of Antigua and Barbuda
Treaties of Argentina
Treaties of Austria
Treaties of Azerbaijan
Treaties of Bangladesh
Treaties of Barbados
Treaties of the Republic of Dahomey
Treaties of Bosnia and Herzegovina
Treaties of the military dictatorship in Brazil
Treaties of Burkina Faso
Treaties of Ivory Coast
Treaties of Croatia
Treaties of Cuba
Treaties of Cyprus
Treaties of Czechoslovakia
Treaties of the Czech Republic
Treaties of Denmark
Treaties of the Dominican Republic
Treaties of Fiji
Treaties of Finland
Treaties of France
Treaties of West Germany
Treaties of East Germany
Treaties of Guatemala
Treaties of Guinea
Treaties of the Hungarian People's Republic
Treaties of Iceland
Treaties of Jordan
Treaties of Kyrgyzstan
Treaties of Liberia
Treaties of the Libyan Arab Jamahiriya
Treaties of Mali
Treaties of Mexico
Treaties of the Mongolian People's Republic
Treaties of Montenegro
Treaties of the Netherlands
Treaties of New Zealand
Treaties of Niger
Treaties of Norway
Treaties of the Philippines
Treaties of the Polish People's Republic
Treaties of Romania
Treaties of Rwanda
Treaties of Samoa
Treaties of Serbia and Montenegro
Treaties of Yugoslavia
Treaties of Slovakia
Treaties of South Africa
Treaties of Francoist Spain
Treaties of Saint Vincent and the Grenadines
Treaties of Sweden
Treaties of North Macedonia
Treaties of Trinidad and Tobago
Treaties of Tunisia
Treaties of the United Kingdom
Treaties of Venezuela
Treaties of South Yemen
Treaties of Zimbabwe
Family law treaties
Treaties adopted by United Nations General Assembly resolutions
Treaties extended to the Netherlands Antilles
Treaties extended to the Faroe Islands
Treaties extended to Greenland
Treaties extended to Akrotiri and Dhekelia
Treaties extended to Saint Christopher-Nevis-Anguilla
Treaties extended to Bermuda
Treaties extended to the British Antarctic Territory
Treaties extended to the British Indian Ocean Territory
Treaties extended to the British Virgin Islands
Treaties extended to the Cayman Islands
Treaties extended to the Falkland Islands
Treaties extended to Gibraltar
Treaties extended to Guernsey
Treaties extended to the Isle of Man
Treaties extended to Jersey
Treaties extended to Montserrat
Treaties extended to the Pitcairn Islands
Treaties extended to Saint Helena, Ascension and Tristan da Cunha
Treaties extended to South Georgia and the South Sandwich Islands
Treaties extended to the Turks and Caicos Islands
Treaties extended to Hong Kong
Treaties extended to Surinam (Dutch colony)
Treaties extended to British Antigua and Barbuda
Treaties extended to Brunei (protectorate)
Treaties extended to British Dominica
Treaties extended to British Grenada
Treaties extended to British Saint Lucia
Treaties extended to British Saint Vincent and the Grenadines
Treaties extended to West Berlin
Treaties of the United States